A list of Records in the Rugby League State of Origin for Queensland Maroons.

Team Records

Streaks

Series Whitewashes

Biggest Win

Biggest Loss

Most Points Scored In A Game

Most Points Conceded In A Game

Most Total Points In A Game (Win)

Most Total Points In A Game (loss)

Fewest Points In A Game (Win)

Fewest Points In A Game (Loss)

Comebacks

Biggest Comeback
15 points.
Trailed New South Wales 15-0 after 30 minutes to win 22-15 in 1981 at Lang Park.

Individual Records
Players in Bold are still active

Most caps (25+)

Most points (40+)

Most tries (7+)

Single match scoring records

Other records

Attendance records
The largest home attendances for Qld State of Origin games are:

 Lang Park (1980-1993) - 33,662 - Game 1, 1984
 Suncorp Stadium (1994-2001) - 40,665 - Game 3, 1994
 ANZ Stadium (2001-2002) - 49,441 - Game 3, 2001
 Suncorp Stadium (2003–present) - 52,540 - Game 3, 2017

References

External links
Queensland's State of Origin records at qrl.com.au

Australian records
Rugby league records and statistics
Records